Hans Seierstad (born 5 June 1951) is a Norwegian politician for the Centre Party.

He served as a deputy representative to the Parliament of Norway from Oppland during the terms 2001–2005 and 2009–2013. In total he met during 50 days of parliamentary session.

From 1999 to 2003, he was the county mayor of Oppland. In 2003 he became mayor of Østre Toten.

References

1951 births
Living people
People from Østre Toten
Deputy members of the Storting
Centre Party (Norway) politicians
Mayors of places in Oppland
Chairmen of County Councils of Norway